Vijayalakshmi Vadlapati (2 December 1960 – 23 September 1996), better known by her stage name Silk Smitha, was an Indian actress and dancer who worked predominantly in Telugu, Tamil, Malayalam, Kannada and Hindi films. Smitha was part of several successful dance numbers in the 1980s Indian films.

She entered the industry as a supporting actress, and was first noticed for her role as "Silk" in the 1979 Tamil film, Vandichakkaram. She became a major and Important role in Tamil cinema was the most sought-after erotic actress in the 1980s. In a career spanning 17 years, she appeared in over 450 films.

Early life 
Smitha was born in a Telugu family, to Ramallu and Sarasamma in Kovvali village, Denduluru Mandal, Eluru. She left school after fourth standard (when she was about 10 years of age) due to the family's financial constraints. Her striking looks burdened her with uninvited attention, and her family married her off at a very young age. Her husband and in-laws treated her poorly and she soon ran away.

Smitha started as a touch-up artist for an actress and soon got a break in small character roles. She got her first movie as a heroine by Malayalam director Anthony Eastman in his film "Inaye Thedi", though the movie got released very much later. Anthony gave her the name Smitha. She got her big break in Tamil by director Vinu Chakravarthy. He took her under his wing; his wife taught her English and arranged for her to learn dancing, though soon, due to her marked sex appeal, she switched to roles of cabaret dancers and vamps and inevitably found herself typecast. After garnering much notice and acclaim with her first major role in the Tamil film Vandichakkaram, in 1979, Smitha assumed the screen name "Silk", after her character's name in the movie. After it became a big hit, she could not escape typecasting, severely limiting her range throughout her career.

Smitha went on to star in Tamil, Malayalam, Telugu, Kannada and a few Hindi films. Her dance numbers and bold performances in films like Moondru Mugam made her the ultimate symbol of sensuality in South Indian cinema. Her item numbers in films like Amaran, Halli Meshtru (in Kannada) were also celebrated at the box office. Some film critics, historians and journalists have referred to her as a "soft porn" actress. A vast majority of her movies are considered "softcore" by Indian standards and a common theme is her playing a freakishly strong agent in skimpy bikinis and beating up huge thugs. Her acting prowess did not go completely unnoticed, and in her rare non-sexual roles she impressed critics and audiences, such as her portrayal of a wife hurt by her role in her husband's rape of their maid (which she passively allowed by not preventing him from entering the maid's bathroom and standing "guard" during the shameful act, to prevent embarrassment to their family) and when she poignantly admitted her mistake in her confrontation of her husband in Alaigal Oivathillai (1981). One of her films, Layanam (1989), has earned cult status in the Indian adult film industry and was dubbed in numerous languages, including Hindi as Reshma Ki Jawani (2002), acquiring cult status. Her most respected film is Moondram Pirai, by Balu Mahendra, remade in Hindi as Sadma, with much of the top-drawer cast, including Sridevi, Kamal Hassan, and Silk Smitha reprising their roles.

Such was her audience-drawing power that, at the peak of her career, according to Tamil film historian Randor Guy, "Films that had lain in cans for years were sold by the simple addition of a Silk Smitha song."

Personal life 
Silk Smitha had a small circle of close friends. She was an introvert and did not make friends quickly with anyone. She is also known for her short temper, willpower and straightforwardness, which some mistook for arrogance. In reality, she was punctual (arriving in movie sets well before the shooting commences), responsible, and ambitious (having learned to speak the English language fluently despite her limited education). She is also described as having a "soft" and "child like" personality by her friends and fans. She was skilled with makeup and made it her profession before entering the industry. She was naturally gorgeous with her well known doe-like eyes, golden complexion and beautiful physique.

Death 
On the morning of 23 September 1996, she contacted her friend, dancer Anuradha, to discuss a matter that was disturbing her. Anuradha planned to visit after dropping her child off at school.

Arriving later that morning, Anuradha found Smitha dead by hanging. A few months after her death, it was declared in the postmortem report that Smitha died by suicide, with high amounts of alcohol in her body.

The police recovered a suicide note from Silk Smitha’s home, however, the note could not be deciphered, turning her death into an unsolved mystery.

Filmography

In popular culture 
In 2011, a film inspired by Silk Smitha's life, titled The Dirty Picture, was produced in Hindi by Ekta Kapoor. The movie was directed by Milan Luthria and starred Vidya Balan (who later won National Film Award for Best Actress). The movie was released on Smitha's birthday, along with its dubbed versions in Telugu and Tamil (2 December 2011) and received favourable reviews. Reports suggest that the family of Silk Smitha, on whom the film is based, is not happy with the movie. Smitha's brother, V. Naga Vara Prasad, claimed the film was made without the family's consent. After the claim, Ekta Kapoor immediately changed her statement by quoting The Dirty Picture is not based on Silk Smitha's life.

In 2013, a Kannada film titled Dirty Picture: Silk Sakkath Hot, starring Pakistani actress Veena Malik was released. The film was based on Silk Smitha, and Veena Malik was praised for her performance in the film. The film was a hit in Karnataka.

A Malayalam film titled Climax, starring Sana Khan as Silk Smitha released on 24 May 2013.

References

Further reading 
 Ashish Rajadhyaksha, Encyclopedia of Indian Cinema, Oxford University Press, 1994
 Roopa Swaminathan, Star Dust: Vignettes from the Fringes of the Film Industry, Penguin, 2004
 Suparna Bhaskaran, 'Decolonizations, Queer Sexualities, Trans/National Projects'', Palgrave Macmillan, 2004

External links 
 

1960 births
1996 deaths
Female suicides
Telugu actresses
Actresses in Kannada cinema
Suicides by hanging in India
Actresses from Andhra Pradesh
Actresses in Malayalam cinema
20th-century Indian actresses
Actresses in Tamil cinema
People from Eluru
Actresses in Telugu cinema
Indian film actresses
Actresses in Hindi cinema
1996 suicides
People from West Godavari district
Artists who committed suicide